Shiloh is a borough in Cumberland County, in the U.S. state of New Jersey. It is part of the Vineland–Bridgeton metropolitan statistical area for statistical purposes. As of the 2020 United States census, the borough's population was 444, a decrease of 72 (−14.0%) from the 2010 census count of 516, which in turn reflected a decline of 18 (−3.4%) from the 534 counted in the 2000 census.

Shiloh was incorporated as a borough by an act of the New Jersey Legislature on April 9, 1929, from portions of Hopewell Township and Stow Creek Township, based on the results of a referendum held on May 16, 1929. The borough was named for the Civil War Battle of Shiloh.

It is a dry town, where alcohol is not permitted to be sold by law, though alcohol is available at the winery in the borough.

History
The settlement of Shiloh was founded in 1705 by Robert Ayars, who brought over 2,000 Seventh Day Baptists from Rhode Island to be free of religious persecution. Known as Cohansey Crossing when a church was formed in the area in 1737, the name Shiloh was adopted in 1771.

When Cumberland County, New Jersey was formed in 1748, the community of Shiloh was divided between Hopewell Township and Stow Creek Township.

As part of a political battle over the site of the county seat for Cumberland County, Columbia Township was formed on March 12, 1844, from portions of Hopewell and Stow Creek Townships; the short-lived municipality included all of present-day Shiloh, in addition to extensive additional land, but all was returned to its original home when Columbia Township was dissolved on March 11, 1845, surviving as an independent municipality for a day short of one year.

Geography
According to the United States Census Bureau, the borough had a total area of 1.20 square miles (3.12 km2), including 1.20 square miles (3.12 km2) of land and <0.01 square miles (<0.01 km2) of water (0.08%).

Shiloh borders Hopewell Township and Stow Creek Township.

Demographics

2010 census

The Census Bureau's 2006–2010 American Community Survey showed that (in 2010 inflation-adjusted dollars) median household income was $61,000 (with a margin of error of +/− $18,454) and the median family income was $63,594 (+/− $11,716). Males had a median income of $44,375 (+/− $18,670) versus $32,105 (+/− $13,923) for females. The per capita income for the borough was $23,003 (+/− $4,509). About 7.0% of families and 8.7% of the population were below the poverty line, including 18.6% of those under age 18 and 10.7% of those age 65 or over.

2000 census
As of the 2000 United States census there were 534 people, 194 households, and 152 families residing in the borough. The racial makeup of the borough was 95.13% White, 2.62% African American, 0.56% Native American, 0.00% from other races, and 1.69% from two or more races. Hispanic or Latino of any race were 3.00% of the population.

There were 194 households, out of which 34.5% had children under the age of 18 living with them, 62.9% were married couples living together, 11.9% had a female householder with no husband present, and 21.6% were non-families. 18.0% of all households were made up of individuals, and 7.2% had someone living alone who was 65 years of age or older. The average household size was 2.75 and the average family size was 3.09.

In the borough the population was spread out, with 24.5% under the age of 18, 5.8% from 18 to 24, 27.9% from 25 to 44, 26.0% from 45 to 64, and 15.7% who were 65 years of age or older. The median age was 40 years. For every 100 females, there were 88.7 males. For every 100 females age 18 and over, there were 85.7 males.

The median income for a household in the borough was $49,191, and the median income for a family was $54,219. Males had a median income of $34,643 versus $20,000 for females. The per capita income for the borough was $16,880. 5.8% of the population and 4.1% of families were below the poverty line. Out of the total people living in poverty, 4.5% are under the age of 18 and 0.0% are 65 or older.

Government

Local government 
Shiloh is governed under the Borough form of New Jersey municipal government, which is used in 218 municipalities (of the 564) statewide, making it the most common form of government in New Jersey. The governing body is comprised of a Mayor and a Borough Council, with all positions elected at-large on a partisan basis as part of the November general election. A Mayor is elected directly by the voters to a four-year term of office. The Borough Council is comprised of six members elected to serve three-year terms on a staggered basis, with two seats coming up for election each year in a three-year cycle. The Borough form of government used by Shiloh is a "weak mayor / strong council" government in which council members act as the legislative body with the mayor presiding at meetings and voting only in the event of a tie. The mayor can veto ordinances subject to an override by a two-thirds majority vote of the council. The mayor makes committee and liaison assignments for council members, and most appointments are made by the mayor with the advice and consent of the council.

, the Mayor of Shiloh is Republican Brad Campbell, whose term of office ends December 31, 2024. Members of the Borough Council are Council President Dallas Bruso (R, 2024), Hillary Barile (R, 2022), Carman Daddario (R, 2022), Jeffrey E. Knerr (R, 2023), Amelia Swartz (R, 2024; appointed to serve an unexpired term) and Medeia D. Willis (R, 2023).

Brad Campbell was appointed to fill the vacant mayoral seat of Harold Davis, following his death in February 2014. The council seat expiring in 2017 held by Carman Daddario became vacant following his being sworn in to serve on the Cumberland County Board of Chosen Freeholders.

Federal, state and county representation
Shiloh is located in the 2nd Congressional District and is part of New Jersey's 1st state legislative district. Prior to the 2011 reapportionment following the 2010 Census, Shiloh had been in the 3rd state legislative district.

Politics
As of March 2011, there were a total of 374 registered voters in Shiloh, of which 80 (21.4%) were registered as Democrats, 117 (31.3%) were registered as Republicans and 176 (47.1%) were registered as Unaffiliated. There was one voter registered to another party.

In the 2012 presidential election, Republican Mitt Romney received 64.1% of the vote (159 cast), ahead of Democrat Barack Obama with 35.5% (88 votes), and other candidates with 0.4% (1 vote), among the 248 ballots cast by the borough's 365 registered voters for a turnout of 67.9%. In the 2008 presidential election, Republican John McCain received 57.1% of the vote (160 cast), ahead of Democrat Barack Obama, who received 40.4% (113 votes), with 280 ballots cast among the borough's 371 registered voters, for a turnout of 75.5%. In the 2004 presidential election, Republican George W. Bush received 66.8% of the vote (183 ballots cast), outpolling Democrat John Kerry, who received around 33.6% (92 votes), with 274 ballots cast among the borough's 352 registered voters, for a turnout percentage of 77.8.

In the 2013 gubernatorial election, Republican Chris Christie received 77.8% of the vote (130 cast), ahead of Democrat Barbara Buono with 19.2% (32 votes), and other candidates with 3.0% (5 votes), among the 170 ballots cast by the borough's 342 registered voters (3 ballots were spoiled), for a turnout of 49.7%. In the 2009 gubernatorial election, Republican Chris Christie received 56.5% of the vote (109 ballots cast), ahead of both Democrat Jon Corzine with 32.6% (63 votes) and Independent Chris Daggett with 6.7% (13 votes), with 193 ballots cast among the borough's 378 registered voters, yielding a 51.1% turnout.

Education 
After Shiloh School was closed following the end of the 2006–07 school year, all public school students in kindergarten through eighth grade now attend Hopewell Crest School as part of a sending/receiving relationship with the Hopewell Township School District. As of the 2018–19 school year, the district, comprised of one school, had an enrollment of 507 students and 36.0 classroom teachers (on an FTE basis), for a student–teacher ratio of 14.1:1.

Public school students in ninth through twelfth grades attend Cumberland Regional High School, which also serves students from Deerfield Township, Fairfield Township, Greenwich Township, Hopewell Township, Stow Creek Township and Upper Deerfield Township. As of the 2018–19 school year, the high school had an enrollment of 1,043 students and 78.5 classroom teachers (on an FTE basis), for a student–teacher ratio of 13.3:1.

Students are also eligible to attend Cumberland County Technology Education Center in Vineland, serving students from the entire county in its full-time technical training programs, which are offered without charge to students who are county residents.

Transportation

Winery
Swansea Vineyards

References

External links

Borough official website
Borough of Shiloh, Cumberland Development Corporation.

 
1929 establishments in New Jersey
Borough form of New Jersey government
Boroughs in Cumberland County, New Jersey
Populated places established in 1929